In the Hebrew Bible Ethni was an ancestor of Asaph, of the Gershonite branch of the Levites. David assigned him to the music ministry of the Lord's house. In , the same person is referred to as "Jeatherai" (KJV spells it "Jeaterai").

References 

10th-century BCE Hebrew people